Jerzy Neyman (April 16, 1894 – August 5, 1981; born Jerzy Spława-Neyman) was a Polish mathematician and statistician who spent the first part of his professional career at various institutions in Warsaw, Poland and then at University College London, and the second part at the University of California, Berkeley. Neyman first introduced the modern concept of a confidence interval into statistical hypothesis testing and co-revised Ronald Fisher's null hypothesis testing (in collaboration with Egon Pearson).

Life and career
He was born into a Polish family in Bendery, in the Bessarabia Governorate of the Russian Empire, the fourth of four children of Czesław Spława-Neyman and Kazimiera Lutosławska. His family was Roman Catholic and Neyman served as an altar boy during his early childhood. Later, Neyman would become an agnostic. Neyman's family descended from a long line of Polish nobles and military heroes. He graduated from the Kamieniec Podolski gubernial gymnasium for boys in 1909 under the name Yuri Cheslavovich Neyman. He began studies at Kharkov University in 1912, where he was taught by Ukrainian probabilist Sergei Natanovich Bernstein. After he read 'Lessons on the integration and the research of the primitive functions' by Henri Lebesgue, he was fascinated with measure and integration.

In 1921, he returned to Poland in a program of repatriation of POWs after the Polish-Soviet War.
He earned his Doctor of Philosophy degree at University of Warsaw in 1924 for a dissertation titled "On the Applications of the Theory of Probability to Agricultural Experiments". He was examined by Wacław Sierpiński and Stefan Mazurkiewicz, among others. He spent a couple of years in London and Paris on a fellowship to study statistics with Karl Pearson and Émile Borel. After his return to Poland, he established the Biometric Laboratory at the Nencki Institute of Experimental Biology in Warsaw.

He published many books dealing with experiments and statistics, and devised the way which the FDA tests medicines today.

Neyman proposed and studied randomized experiments in 1923. Furthermore, his paper "On the Two Different Aspects of the Representative Method: The Method of Stratified Sampling and the Method of Purposive Selection", given at the Royal Statistical Society on 19 June 1934, was the groundbreaking event leading to modern scientific sampling. He introduced the confidence interval in his paper in 1937. Another noted contribution is the Neyman–Pearson lemma, the basis of hypothesis testing.

He was an Invited Speaker of the ICM in 1928 in Bologna and a Plenary Speaker of the ICM in 1954 in Amsterdam.

In 1938, he moved to Berkeley, where he worked for the rest of his life. Thirty-nine students received their Ph.Ds under his advisorship. In 1966, he was awarded the Guy Medal of the Royal Statistical Society and three years later the U.S. National Medal of Science. He died in Oakland, California in 1981.

See also
 List of Poles

References

Citations

Sources 

 Fisher, Ronald "Statistical methods and scientific induction" Journal of the Royal Statistical Society, Series B 17 (1955), 69–78. (criticism of statistical theories of Jerzy Neyman and Abraham Wald)
  (reply to Fisher 1955)
 Reid, Constance, Jerzy Neyman—From Life, Springer Verlag, (1982), .

External links

 
 ASA biographical article by Chin Long Chiang
 
 Biography of Jerzy Neyman from the Institute for Operations Research and the Management Sciences

1894 births
1981 deaths
People from Bender, Moldova
People from Bendersky Uyezd
National Medal of Science laureates
Presidents of the Institute of Mathematical Statistics
Fellows of the American Statistical Association
Fellows of the Econometric Society
Polish statisticians
American statisticians
Survey methodologists
National University of Kharkiv alumni
University of California, Berkeley faculty
Mathematical analysts
Philosophers of science
American philosophers

People from the Russian Empire of Polish descent
American agnostics
Polish agnostics
Former Roman Catholics
Foreign Members of the Royal Society
20th-century American mathematicians
20th-century Polish mathematicians
Members of the Polish Academy of Sciences
Members of the United States National Academy of Sciences
20th-century Polish philosophers
Members of the Royal Swedish Academy of Sciences
Academics of University College London
Mathematical statisticians